Gold Diggers of 1937 is a Warner Bros. movie musical directed by Lloyd Bacon with musical numbers created and directed by Busby Berkeley. The film stars Dick Powell and Joan Blondell, who were married at the time, with Glenda Farrell and Victor Moore.

The film features songs by the teams of Harold Arlen and E.Y. Harburg, and Harry Warren and Al Dubin. It was based on the play "Sweet Mystery of Life" by Richard Maibaum, Michael Wallach and George Haight, which ran briefly on Broadway in 1935. Warren Duff wrote the screenplay with the assistance of Tom Reed, who was billed as "Screenplay constructor".

This is the fifth movie in Warner Bros.' series of "Gold Digger" films, following the now lost films The Gold Diggers (1923), a silent film, and the partially lost sound film Gold Diggers of Broadway (1929), as well as Gold Diggers of 1933 – a remake of The Gold Diggers and the first to feature Busby Berkeley's extravagant production numbers – and Gold Diggers of 1935. Gold Diggers of 1937 was followed by Gold Diggers in Paris (1938).

Plot
Meek, aging, hypochondriac stage producer J.J. Hobart (Victor Moore), who always thinks he is about to die, is going to mount a new show, but his partners Morty Wethered (Osgood Perkins) and Tom Hugo (Charles D. Brown) lost the money for the show in the stock market. On the advice of chorus girl Genevieve Larkin (Glenda Farrell), they insure J.J. for a million dollars, so that when he dies, they will have the money they need to produce the show.  Genevieve's friend, ex-chorus girl Norma Perry (Joan Blondell) is sweet on insurance salesman Rosmer "Rossi" Peek (Dick Powell), and he writes the policy.

When Rosmer's boss, Andy Callahan (William B. Davidson) finds out how old J.J. is, he is afraid he will not pass the physical, but when Hobart does, Rosmer decides he has to keep J.J. alive as long as possible, to reap the rewards of his sale.  On the other hand, Morty and Hugo have everything to gain if J.J. dies, and they try to help things along. When that fails, they talk Genevieve into seducing J.J., but she ends up falling in love with him instead. Rosmer finds out the reason for the insurance policy, and talks his boss, Callahan, into investing in J.J.'s show, to save the company the money it would have to pay if J.J. dropped dead after learning he was broke and could not put on the show.  When the show is a success Genevieve and J.J. get married, and so do Norma and Rosmer.

Cast

 Dick Powell as Rosmer " Rossi" Peek
 Joan Blondell as Norma Perry
 Glenda Farrell as Genevieve "Gen" Larkin
 Victor Moore as J. J. Hobart
 Lee Dixon as Boop Oglethorpe
 Osgood Perkins as Morty Wethered
 Charles D. Brown as Tom Hugo
 Rosalind Marquis as Sally LaVerne
 Irene Ware as Irene
 William B. Davidson as Andy Callahan
 Olin Howland as Dr. MacDuffy
 Charles Halton as Dr. Bell
 Paul Irving as Dr. Warshof
 Harry C. Bradley as Dr. Henry
 Joseph Crehan as Chairman
 Susan Fleming as Lucille Bailey

Songs
The production numbers were created, designed, staged and directed by Busby Berkeley. Originally, all the songs for the film were to have been written by Harold Arlen and E.Y. "Yip" Harburg, but Berkeley was dissatisfied and brought in Harry Warren and Al Dubin, who had contributed songs to his previous Warner Bros. films.  Their song "With Plenty of Money and You" (which was subtitled "The Gold Diggers' Lullaby") became a hit.

 "Speaking of the Weather" - by Harold Arlen (music) and E.Y. Harburg (lyrics)
 "Let's Put Our Heads Together" - by Arlen and Harburg
 "With Plenty of Money and You (The Gold Diggers' Lullaby)" - by Harry Warren (music) and Al Dubin (lyrics)
 "Life Insurance Song" - by Arlen and Harburg
 "All's Fair in Love and War" - by Warren and Dubin – The staging for this number utilized 104 women in white military uniforms tapping in military formations and geometric patterns. 
 "Hush Mah Mouth" - by Arlen and Harburg (deleted from final print)

Production
Although Busby Berkeley had directed Gold Diggers of 1935, for this film the director's chair was occupied by Warner Bros. comedy veteran Lloyd Bacon, who had collaborated with Berkeley on 42nd Street.  Gold Diggers of 1937 marked Victor Moore's return to the screen after a two-year absence following Gift of Gab, during which he starred in Anything Goes on Broadway.

The film was in production at Warner Bros. Burbank studio beginning in mid-July 1936, and premiered on 26 December 1936. It went into general release two days later.

Awards and honors
In 1937, Busby Berkeley was nominated for an Academy Award for Best Dance Direction for the "All's Fair in Love and War" production number. Hermes Pan won for the "Funhouse sequence" in A Damsel in Distress.

Adaptation
A one-hour radio adaptation, titled Gold Diggers, aired on Lux Radio Theatre on December 21, 1936. During the introduction host Cecil B. DeMille explained that this adaptation combined the plot of Gold Diggers of 1933 with the music of Gold Diggers of 1937. This radio adaptation starred Dick Powell and Joan Blondell, who had appeared in both movies.

References
Notes

BibliographyGreen, Stanley (1999) Hollywood Musicals Year by Year'' (2nd ed.). Hal Leonard Corporation. p. 64

External links
 
 
 
 

1936 films
1936 musical films
American musical films
American black-and-white films
1930s English-language films
Films about musical theatre
Films directed by Busby Berkeley
Films directed by Lloyd Bacon
Films with screenplays by Richard Maibaum
Warner Bros. films
1930s American films